The 1950 Coupe de France Final was a football match held at Stade Olympique Yves-du-Manoir, Colombes on 14 May 1950, that saw Stade de Reims defeat RC Paris 2–0 thanks to goals by Francis Méano and André Petitfils.

Match details

See also
Coupe de France 1949-1950

External links
Coupe de France results at Rec.Sport.Soccer Statistics Foundation
Report on French federation site

Coupe
1950
Coupe De France Final 1950
Coupe De France Final 1950
Sport in Hauts-de-Seine
Coupe de France Final
Coupe de France Final